Goin' To Town is a 1935 musical comedy film directed by Alexander Hall and written by Mae West. The film stars Mae West, Paul Cavanagh, Gilbert Emery, Marjorie Gateson, Tito Coral and Ivan Lebedeff. The film was released on April 25, 1935, by Paramount Pictures. the film stars West as Lady Lou, a wealthy and flamboyant woman who travels to Texas to claim an inheritance and becomes embroiled in a series of comical misunderstandings and romantic entanglements.

West was already a well-known actress, singer, and playwright when Goin' To Town was released, and her bold, controversial performances and bawdy, irreverent humor had made her a popular figure in Hollywood's pre-Code era. In Goin' To Town, she brings all of these qualities to the role of Lady Lou, delivering a memorable and entertaining performance that has helped to make the film a classic of its time.

The film was a box office success upon its release and received generally positive reviews from critics, who praised its humor and West's performance. In the years since its release, Goin' To Town has continued to be remembered and enjoyed by audiences, and it remains a popular choice for fans of classic Hollywood cinema.

Despite the passage of time, Goin' To Town remains a fresh and entertaining film that is sure to delight audiences of all ages. Whether you're a fan of Mae West or just looking for a fun and lighthearted comedy.

Plot

Cast
Mae West as Cleo Borden
Paul Cavanagh as Edward Carrington
Gilbert Emery as Winslow
Marjorie Gateson as Mrs. Crane Brittony
Tito Coral as Taho
Ivan Lebedeff as Ivan Valadov
Fred Kohler as Buck Gonzales
Monroe Owsley as Fletcher Colton
Grant Withers as Young Stud
Luis Alberni as Sr. Vitola
Lucio Villegas as Señor Ricardo Lopez
Mona Rico as Dolores Lopez
Wade Boteler as Ranch foreman
Paul Harvey as Donovan
Joe Frye as Laughing Eagle
Vladimar Bykoff as Tenor

References

External links
 
 
 
 

1935 films
1935 musical comedy films
1935 romantic comedy films
American musical comedy films
American romantic comedy films
American romantic musical films
American black-and-white films
Films directed by Alexander Hall
Paramount Pictures films
Films with screenplays by Mae West
1930s romantic musical films
1930s English-language films
1930s American films